Parocyptamus is a genus of hoverflies, with two known species. The critical characteristic is the narrow, elongated abdomen.

Biology
Larvae are found in ant nests.

Distribution
They are native to parts of Asia.

Species
P. sonamii Shiraki, 1930
P. stenogaster (Curran, 1931)

References

Hoverfly genera
Diptera of Asia
Microdontinae